Alfred Hitch (14 July 1876 – 1962) was an English professional footballer who played as a right-half or centre-half. He played in the Football League for Walsall and Nottingham Forest, and in the Southern League for Thames Ironworks, Queens Park Rangers and Watford.

Hitch joined Second Division club Walsall in 1897 and made two appearances. In 1898, he made six appearances for Thames Ironworks, the club that would later be reformed as West Ham United.

He joined Queens Park Rangers in 1899 for the club's initial season in the Southern League First Division. He spent a season at First Division Nottingham Forest in 1901–02, before returning to QPR to captain the team. He ended his career at Watford, where he was also appointed captain.

Hitch was chosen to play in a 'South vs North' trial match for England in February 1901.

References

1876 births
1962 deaths
Sportspeople from Walsall
English footballers
Association football midfielders
Walsall F.C. players
Telford United F.C. players
Thames Ironworks F.C. players
Grays United F.C. players
Queens Park Rangers F.C. players
Nottingham Forest F.C. players
Watford F.C. players
English Football League players
Southern Football League players